Shi Jiayi ( born 2 September 1983) is a naturalized Singaporean former footballer who played as a midfielder.

Club career
Born in Shanghai, China, Shi started his career at Shanghai state's Football Academy. He moved to Singaporean's Sinchi FC in 2003.

He made an immediate impact with the Young Lions after joining from  Sinchi FC during the mid-season transfer window in 2004. A positive, hardworking midfielder, his performances earned him a nomination for the S.League Young Player of the Year award. He captained Home United FC for the 2011 season. After the end of the 2012 S.League season, Shi signed for Warriors FC.

Shi scored his first goal of the 2015 S.League season in the second league game of the season, guiding the Warriors to a 3–1 victory over Harimau Muda and sending his club to the top of the table. At the end of the season, Shi was released from the club and returned to China, retiring from professional football.

International career
Shi made his debut for the Singapore national football team on 11 October 2005 against Cambodia.

He was an integral part of the team during the 2007 AFF Championship in which Singapore defeated Thailand 3–2 in the Finals.

He scored his first international goal against Palestine.

International goals

Personal life
Shi was awarded Singapore citizenship in 2005.

Honours

Club
Home United
 Singapore Cup: 2011

Warriors FC
S.League: 2014
Singapore Charity Shield: 2015

International
Singapore
AFF Championship: 2007, 2012

References

External links

fas.org.sg

1983 births
Living people
Footballers from Shanghai
Chinese footballers
Singaporean footballers
Singapore international footballers
Chinese emigrants to Singapore
Singaporean sportspeople of Chinese descent
Naturalised citizens of Singapore
Home United FC players
Warriors FC players
Singapore Premier League players
Association football midfielders
Young Lions FC players
Footballers at the 2006 Asian Games
Asian Games competitors for China